The Priester Building is a historic building located just north of Downtown Davenport, Iowa, United States. The low-rise office building was built for the headquarters of Priester Construction Company in 1959. The L-shaped structure offers "a strong essay in the International Style." It was listed on the National Register of Historic Places in 2017. A plan has been developed by Newbury Living of West Des Moines, Iowa to convert the building from office space into a 33-unit apartment building.

References

Office buildings completed in 1959
Modernist architecture in Iowa
International style architecture in Iowa
Buildings and structures in Davenport, Iowa
Office buildings on the National Register of Historic Places in Iowa
National Register of Historic Places in Davenport, Iowa